The Rural Municipality of Fillmore No. 96 is a rural municipality (RM) in the Canadian province of Saskatchewan within Census Division No. 2 and  Division No. 1. It is located in the south-east portion of the province along Highway 33.

History 
The RM of Fillmore No. 96 incorporated as a rural municipality on December 13, 1909. It was previously Local Improvement District No. 6–E–2.

Geography

Communities and localities 
The following urban municipalities are surrounded by the RM.
Villages
 Creelman
 Fillmore
 Osage

The following unincorporated communities are within the RM.
Localities
 Huronville

Osage Wildlife Refuge 
Osage Wildlife Refuge is a wildlife conservation area in the RM of Fillmore, about 3 miles south-east of Osage along Highway 33. It is on the south side of the highway at 49°56′0″N, 103°33′2″W.

Demographics 

Government 
The RM of Fillmore No. 96 is governed by an elected municipal council and an appointed administrator that meets on the second Wednesday of every month. The reeve of the RM is Russell Leguee while its administrator is Vernna Wiggins. The RM's office is located in Fillmore.

Transportation 
Rail
Souris-Arcola-Regina Section Canadian Pacific Railway (CPR) —serves Stoughton, Heward, Creelman, Fillmore, Osage, Tyvan, Francis, and Sedley

Roads
Highway 33—serves Fillmore and Village of Osage
Highway 606—serves Fillmore
Highway 711—serves the Village of Osage
Highway 619—serves the Village of Osage

Gallery

See also 
List of rural municipalities in Saskatchewan

References

External links

F

Division No. 2, Saskatchewan